Neal Jimenez (May 22, 1960 – December 11, 2022) was an American screenwriter and film director, best known for the 1986 film River's Edge.  He was a member of the dramatic jury at the Sundance Film Festival in 1994. He won Independent Spirit Awards for Best First Feature and Best Screenplay for The Waterdance.

Biography
Jimenez was born in Sacramento, California American family. He initially enrolled at Santa Clara University, studying English, but transferred to the UCLA School of Theater, Film and Television, where he wrote the script for River's Edge.

In 1984, while a film student, he went hiking with some friends and slipped on a rock, falling twenty feet into a shallow pool below. He was initially paralyzed from the neck down but subsequent surgeries restored movement to his upper body, making him paraplegic. The film The Waterdance, which he wrote and co-directed, was partly based on his experience in rehabilitation. It stars Eric Stoltz as a successful young writer who must deal with his new life confined to a wheelchair. It won Best First Feature and Best Screenplay at the 1993 Independent Spirit Awards.

Jimenez wrote a number of films in the 1980s and 1990s, most notably River's Edge, starring Crispin Glover, Keanu Reeves, and Dennis Hopper, as well as For the Boys, starring Bette Midler. He also worked as a script doctor on films such as Outbreak.

Jimenez died of heart failure in Arroyo Grande, California, on December 11, 2022, at the age of 62.

Filmography as writer
 Hideaway - 1995
 Sleep with Me - 1994
 The Waterdance - 1992
 The Dark Wind - 1991
 For the Boys - 1991
 Where the River Runs Black - 1986
 River's Edge - 1986

Filmography as director
 The Waterdance - 1992

References

External links
 
 

1960 births
2022 deaths
20th-century American screenwriters
American film directors of Mexican descent
American male screenwriters
Deaths from congestive heart failure
Film directors from California
People with paraplegia
Santa Clara University alumni
Screenwriters from California
UCLA Film School alumni
Writers from Sacramento, California